is a convenience store franchise chain in Japan.

There are 818 shops in the Chugoku, Kanto, Kansai, Kyushu, and Shikoku regions.

History
Poplar was founded as a liquor shop in Naka-ku, Hiroshima in 1976. The first Poplar shop was opened in Minami-ku, Hiroshima in 1983. Poplar Foods was established in 1996.

References

External links
 
  

1976 establishments in Japan
Companies based in Hiroshima Prefecture
Convenience stores of Japan
Retail companies established in 1976
Companies listed on the Tokyo Stock Exchange